The Croatia women's national under-20 basketball team is a national basketball team of Croatia, administered by the Croatian Basketball Federation. It represents the country in women's international under-20 basketball competitions.

FIBA U20 Women's European Championship participations

FIBA Under-21 World Championship for Women participations

See also
Croatia women's national basketball team
Croatia women's national under-18 basketball team
Croatia women's national under-16 basketball team

References

External links
Archived records of Croatia team participations

Croatia women's national basketball team
Women's national under-20 basketball teams